The Central Market (meaning "New Grand Market") is a market and an art deco landmark in Phnom Penh, the capital of Cambodia. The bright yellow building completed in 1937 has a 26-metre high central dome, with four tall arch-roofed arms branching out diagonally across the block, creating vast hallways housing countless stalls and a variety of goods. Initially designed by city architect Jean Desbois, construction works were supervised by French architect Louis Chauchon. When it first opened in 1937, it was said to be the biggest market in Asia; today it still operates as a market.

History 
After Phnom Penh became the capital of the French protectorate of Cambodia within French Indochina in 1867, the population grew enormously and the French set about creating a spacious modern city. The decision to build a market dates back to the end of the 1920s in response to the increase in the population to 90,000 inhabitants. It was decided to build it on a marshland in the center of the Chinatown of the time, but the project did not start until 1934 because of the turmoil of the Great Depression. It was designed by Jean Desbois (1891 Cherbourg -1971 Lorient), the architect of the city from 1931 to 1937, and its implementation was supervised by Louis Chauchon (1875 - 1945 Saigon) and the engineer Wladimir Kandaouroff. The works were entrusted to the Indochinese Society of Studies and Construction which had already built the markets of Battambang and Cholon. The marsh was drained and work began in August 1935 and was completed in 22 months later; the market was inaugurated by King Sisowath Monivong in September 1937  .

Since its completion, wet season flooding around the market has remained a problem, a reminder of the marshland it once was. The areas between the four diagonal arms and the surrounding streets were originally planted as gardens; over the years the gardens were gradually filled with various temporary structures, greatly increasing the number of stalls. During the Franco-Thai war in 1941 the market was bombed by Thai aircraft, causing heavy damage, and it had to be temporarily closed. After the end of World War II it was restored much as it was.

From 2009 to 2011, it underwent a US$4.2 million renovation funded by the French Development Agency. This renovation repaired and restored all the original reinforced concrete structure, and added low arched roofed stall areas in the originally open areas on all four sides. The entrances to the market are lined with souvenir merchants hawking everything from T-shirts and postcards to silver curios and kramas. Inside is a dazzling display of jewels and gold. Electronic goods, stationery, secondhand clothes and flowers are also sold.

Gallery

See also 
 List of markets in Phnom Penh

References 

Central Market: Story of a renovation.  Municipality of Phnom Penh - Melon rouge Agency, Editor and Publisher

External links
 360° aerial panorama of Central Market, Phnom Penh

Retail buildings in Cambodia
Buildings and structures in Phnom Penh
Art Deco architecture
Tourist attractions in Phnom Penh
Market houses